Altair is a 1956 Italian melodrama film directed by Leonardo De Mitri and starring Franco Interlenghi, Antonella Lualdi and Jacques Sernas.

Plot 
Naples. In the military academy of the Nisida Air Force a new course begins which sees among the new recruits called "chicks": Giorgio, forced by his father after he squandered millions at the gaming table; De Montel son of a general, Mario who wants to follow in the footsteps of his father who died in combat; Antonio who declares himself Neapolitan while coming from the province and Ugo who comes from the north.

Giorgio suffers from the rigid military life from which he always tries to escape while the others are interested in his career. During a leave of absence, De Montel meets Luisa, Giorgio's sister who has returned to the game table in plain clothes. The captain puts him under arrest and he convinces the comrade that it was Mario who was the spy and that he must be isolated.

Giorgio meets Elena, a hostess several times, thanks to which he begins to understand the importance of not only an emotional commitment. De Montel discovers that he has a weak heart that does not allow him to continue his military life and Mario, disappointed by the isolation in which he finds himself, thinks of leaving his uniform and going back to work in his mother's tobacconist. When after months Giorgio discovers Mario's innocence he goes to him to apologize and convince him to return to the Academy, he also learns that Elena has just died in a plane crash.

The academic year ends, De Montel is forced to leave due to health problems while the others have earned the driver's badge. At the time of saying goodbye, Giorgio confesses that he wants to remain in the body until he becomes a general and Mario gives the badge to De Montel which is part of him accompanied by Luisa.

Cast 
 Franco Interlenghi as Farini Giorgio
 Antonella Lualdi as  Elena Grimani
 Jacques Sernas as De Montel
 Claude Laydu as  Mario Rossi
 Carlo Croccolo as  Antonio Labbate
  as  Luisa Farini
 Nerio Bernardi as The Colonel
 Enzo Fiermonte
 Luigi Tosi
 Nino Vingelli
  Nino Imparato
 Rino Genovese
 Carlo Tamberlani
 Piero Carnabuci

References

External links
 

French romantic drama films
1956 romantic drama films
Italian romantic drama films
Films about military personnel
1950s Italian films
1950s French films
1956 films